BBC Radio Devon is the BBC's local radio station serving the county of Devon.

It broadcasts on FM, DAB, digital TV and via BBC Sounds from studios in the Mannamead area of Plymouth.

According to RAJAR, the station has a weekly audience of 150,000 listeners and a 7.1% share as of December 2022.

History
BBC Radio Devon started broadcasting on 17 January 1983, replacing the BBC Radio 4 regional breakfast show Morning Sou'West. On the same day, BBC Radio Cornwall started broadcasting, as did BBC Breakfast television.

When broadcasting started, the new studios in Exeter had not yet been finished, so BBC Radio Devon was broadcast from portable cabins for the first few weeks. The Exeter studios were officially opened by Alastair Milne, then Director-General of the BBC, on 30 September 1983.

BBC Radio Devon has reporters based in Exeter, Plymouth, Paignton and Barnstaple, allowing it to cover news stories throughout Devon. The Plymouth newsroom is shared with the BBC's regional TV news programme Spotlight and also provides online news services. The station has won several Sony Awards for its programming.

Frequencies 

Radio Devon is broadcast on the following frequencies from BBC Broadcasting House in Plymouth and Pynes Hill in Exeter (transmitter location in brackets):

 FM:
 103.4 MHz main frequency (North Hessary Tor)
 94.8 MHz in Barnstaple (Huntshaw Cross)
 95.7 MHz in Plymouth (Plympton)
 95.8 MHz in Exeter (St. Thomas)
 96.0 MHz in Okehampton
 104.3 MHz in Torbay and Torquay and the South Hams (Beacon Hill)
 DAB

In addition, BBC Radio Devon also broadcasts on Freeview TV channel 720 in the BBC South West region and streams online via BBC Sounds.

The station also broadcast on 1458 kHz in the Torbay area until the transmitter closed on 15 January 2018.

The station's other AM transmissions, 801 kHz in North Devon (Barnstaple) and 990 kHz in Exeter, were slated to cease in May/June 2021; however, this was postponed and the transmissions remained on air until after the 1100 BST news on 3 August 2021.

Radio Devon previously broadcast on 855 AM in Plymouth; these transmissions ceased in 2007 and the frequency was used for a trial of Digital Radio Mondiale services, though these trials ultimately did not lead to DRM going into permanent service in the UK.

Programming
Local programming is produced and broadcast from the BBC's Plymouth studios from 6am - 1am on Sundays - Fridays and from 6am -6pm on Saturdays.

Some of the station's off-peak evening output is simulcast with sister stations in the BBC South West and BBC West regions.

During the station's downtime, BBC Radio Devon simulcasts overnight programming from BBC Radio 5 Live and BBC Radio London.

Presenters

Notable current presenters include:

Toby Buckland (Sunday mid-mornings)

References

External links 
 

Devon
Companies based in Devon
Radio stations in Devon
Radio stations established in 1983
1983 establishments in England